With 1925 origins as a research station on Solomons Island, the University of Maryland Center for Environmental Science (UMCES) is the only scientific research center within the University System of Maryland. In 1973 it became the Center for Environmental and Estuarine Studies and in 1997 it assumed its current name.

The center provides a unified focus for environmental research and education in Maryland, United States, with special attention to problems of the Chesapeake Bay, but research programs are undertaken across the US and globally. Its educational opportunities include graduate studies and undergraduate research internships.  The center has  about 60 faculty and 110 graduate students. Dr. Donald Boesch served as the institution's president from 1990 until 2017, and has been succeeded by Dr. Peter Goodwin.

UMCES programs are conducted at five constituent research locations:

Appalachian Laboratory (Frostburg, Maryland)
Chesapeake Biological Laboratory (Solomons, Maryland)
Horn Point Laboratory (Cambridge, Maryland)
Institute of Marine and Environmental Technology (Baltimore, Maryland)
Maryland Sea Grant College (College Park, Maryland)

The Center also administers the Integration and Application Network.

See also
 Chesapeake Research Consortium

External links

Center for Environmental Science
Cambridge, Maryland
Schools in Dorchester County, Maryland
Center for Environmental Science
Environmental Science
Research institutes in Maryland